Time control may refer to:
 Time control, a mechanism in the tournament play of board games.
 Time control (electrical grid), a mechanism to maintain the average frequency of an electrical grid.
 Time Control, a studio album by Hiromi Uehara’s group.